Argyropelecus hemigymnus, the half-naked hatchetfish, short silver hatchetfish or spurred hatchetfish, is a deep-sea hatchetfish of the genus Argyropelecus found mesopelagically in the Atlantic, Indian, and Pacific Oceans as well as in the Mediterranean Sea. It is a small species rarely exceeding  standard length. It feeds on zooplankton, particularly ostracods and copepods. Sexual maturation occurs at length of about 22 mm, and adult males have more developed olfactory organs than females, i.e. the species is sexually dimorphic.

References

Sternoptychidae
Fish of the Atlantic Ocean
Fish of the Indian Ocean
Fish of the Mediterranean Sea
Fish of the Pacific Ocean
Bioluminescent fish
Fish described in 1829
Taxa named by Anastasio Cocco